The Women's 1500 Freestyle event at the 2011 FINA World Championships was held on July 25 and 26, 2011 in Shanghai, China. Preliminary heats were swum July 25, with the top-8 swimmers advancing to swim again in the final on July 26.

Records
Prior to the competition, the existing world and championship records were as follows.

Results

Heats
26 swimmer participated in 4 heats.

Final
The final was held at 18:35.

References

External links
2011 World Aquatics Championships: Women's 1500 metre freestyle start list, from OmegaTiming.com; retrieved 2011-07-23.

Freestyle 1500 metre freestyle, men's
World Aquatics Championships
2011 in women's swimming